Štěpán Horváth (born December 20, 1982) is a Czech professional boxer who held the WBO European junior middleweight title between 2016 and 2017.

External links

1982 births
Light-middleweight boxers
Living people
Czech male boxers
Sportspeople from Chomutov